Faculty of Law, University of Mostar is a public institution belonging to the University of Mostar located in Mostar in Bosnia and Herzegovina.

History 

Until 1971, Faculty of Law in Mostar was a branch of the University of Sarajevo's Law School. On 15 November 1976, Faculty of Law become started to act independently.

Organisation 

As of 2012/13 academic year, the Faculty of Law adopted the Bologna Process and undertook necessary reforms. Undergraduate study lasts for eight semesters (for academic years), and after finishing it, a student gets a bachelor's degree (provostupnik). Graduate study lasts for two semesters (one academic year), and after graduation, a student gains the title of a master of law (magistar). The doctoral study lasts for six semesters (three academic years).

The Faculty of Law has its departments in Vitez and Orašje. Both departments have the undergraduate and the graduate studies.

The doctoral studies have several specialisations: the constitutional law, the criminal law, the civil law, the legal history, the economic law, the international law and the industrial-administrative law.

There are around 1,000 students at the Faculty of Law.

References 

Educational institutions established in 1976
Law schools in Bosnia and Herzegovina
Mostar
1976 establishments in Yugoslavia